James Leslie (4 September 1786 – 6 December 1873) was a Canadian businessman and political figure. He was named to the Senate of Canada for Alma division in 1867 and died in office.

He was born in Kair, Kincardineshire, Scotland, the son of James Leslie, his father was an assistant quartermaster in the British Army who served with General Wolfe at Quebec City in 1759. He studied at Marischal College and the University of Aberdeen and came to Lower Canada in 1804. Leslie owned a food wholesale company in Montreal. He was a member of the local militia and served during the War of 1812; he later became lieutenant-colonel. He helped form the Bank of Montreal and served as a director from 1817 to 1829. He owned the seigneuries of Bourchemin, Ramesay and Lake Matapédia. He represented Montreal East in the Legislative Assembly of Lower Canada from 1824 to 1838. He supported representation by population and so opposed the Union of Upper and Lower Canada. He was elected to the Legislative Assembly of the Province of Canada for Verchères as a Reformer in an 1841 by-election; he was reelected in 1844 and 1847. He was named president of the Executive Council in 1848; he was named secretary for Canada East in September of that year and served until 1851. Also in 1848, he was named to the Legislative Council and served until Confederation, when he was named to the Senate.

He died in Montreal in 1873.

The Township of Leslie (formerly part of Leslie-Clapham-et-Huddersfield, now part of Otter Lake) in Quebec was named in his honour.

Archives 
There is a James Leslie and family fonds at Library and Archives Canada.

References

 
 

1786 births
1873 deaths
Canadian senators from Quebec
Conservative Party of Canada (1867–1942) senators
Members of the Legislative Assembly of Lower Canada
Members of the Legislative Assembly of the Province of Canada from Canada East
Members of the Legislative Council of the Province of Canada
People from Aberdeenshire
People from Montreal
Scottish emigrants to pre-Confederation Quebec
Alumni of the University of Aberdeen
Directors of Bank of Montreal
Immigrants to Lower Canada